East Red Wing is a neighborhood of the city of Red Wing in Goodhue County, Minnesota, United States.

History 
East Red Wing was incorporated as a village in 1857. Shortly after this, the village charter was revoked by the state, and the village was merged with Red Wing on March 19, 1857.

References

Populated places established in 1857
1857 disestablishments in Minnesota Territory
Former municipalities in Minnesota
Neighborhoods in Minnesota
Geography of Goodhue County, Minnesota
Red Wing, Minnesota
1857 establishments in Minnesota Territory
Populated places disestablished in 1857